Doru is a Romanian male name, probably derived from Tudor, the Romanian version of Theodore.

Notable personalities with this name:

 Doru Borobeică, guitarist
 Doru Davidovici, aviator and writer
 Doru Viorel Ursu, politician

References
Doru at behindthename.com

Romanian masculine given names